Motorcycle Jesus is the first extended play by Boots. It is the soundtrack to his thirty-minute short film, with the same name. Boots made the 5-song EP available to stream on March 2, 2015.

Track listing

References

2015 EPs
2015 soundtrack albums
Boots (musician) albums
Pop rock EPs